Systancia is a French software company that develops software for desktop and application virtualisation, cloud computing and remote access security solutions. It was founded in 1998 and is located in Sausheim, France.

Systancia acquired IPdiva, a security solutions provider at the end of 2013.

In 2012, Systancia received finance from the French Deposits and Consignments Fund (now known as BPI), for enabling accelerated conditions for its international development.

History
Systancia's earliest developments date back to 1998 with a view to creating new types of low-cost, multi-processor computers (Intel) providing administration for the remote execution of user applications on the most available servers and desktops thereby making redundant resources available to companies for the execution of their usual applications.

It entered Deloitte's 2010 Technology Fast 500 EMEA list, a ranking of the 500 fastest growing technology companies in EMEA, ranked Number 268.

Products

AppliDis - Application and desktop virtualization 

Developed by Systancia, AppliDis is a virtualisation software that incorporates both application and desktop virtualization as a single product, with management through a single web console. The latest version, AppliDis Fusion 5, was released on 20 May 2015.

The application virtualization is based on Microsoft Windows Terminal Services (via the RDP - Remote Desktop Protocol). The desktop virtualization (also called Virtual Desktop or VDI - Virtual Desktop Infrastructure) is based on the exchange with different hypervisors such as ESX, VMware Vcenter, Citrix XenServer, Microsoft Hyper-V Server, Parallels Inc., Virtual Iron. AppliDis Fusion 4 is application transparent, meaning it can manage and virtualise all Windows applications and desktops ( Windows operating system: XP, Vista, Seven, Windows 8, Windows 10, or under Windows RDS).

AppliDis ezPrint - Printing by using a centralised environment 
AppliDis ezPrint (formerly AppliDis Universal Printer) is a universal printing software ( local or remote connection, centralised or virtualised architecture) that allows the administration of user print options with a single printer on the server. It provides compression features that reduce the size of print files from application servers to local printers.

IPdiva Secure - External access protection, control and traceability 
IPdiva Secure is a security software for all external access to IT system resources:

 secure and monitored synchronisation to and from smartphones / mobiles (ActiveSync mode),
 secure application and system access (VPN SSL portal mode),
 secure Intranet access (Reverse proxy mode).

IPdiva Secure software is based on a distributed architecture:
 IPdiva Server: acts as a centralised gatekeeper for external access requests:single point of entry to the sites hosting the systems or access to published applications, mutual authentication and access control, central repository for all traces of remote access.
 IPdiva Gateway: acts as an interface between IPdiva Server and the applications, files, or systems to be accessed remotely.
The communication is secured between IPdiva Server and IPdiva Gateway via an outgoing SSL server, without any intervention on the firewall or router in place.

IPdiva Care - Check and record: surveillance and video recording 
IPdiva Care is security software that controls and records all actions (TSE/RDP VNC or SSH) carried out the sensitive servers.

References

External links 
 Systancia official website
 Systancia France website

Software companies of France
Software companies established in 1998
Virtualization software
Remote desktop
Remote administration software